The discography of Canadian country music artist Michelle Wright consists of ten studio albums, two compilations, one live album, 48 singles and 18 music videos.

Albums

Studio albums

Compilation albums

Live albums

Singles

1980s and 1990s

2000s—2020s

Guest singles

Music videos

Notes

A ^ "Take It Like a Man" also peaked at number 52 on RPM Top Singles chart in Canada.
B ^  "Your Love" also peaked at number 19 on the Billboard Hot Adult Contemporary Tracks chart in the U.S.
C ^ "I Surrender" also peaked at number 3 on the RPM Adult Contemporary Tracks chart in Canada.

References

Discographies of Canadian artists
Country music discographies